Blastobasis elgonae is a moth in the  family Blastobasidae. It is found in Kenya, where it is known from Mount Elgon in the western highlands.

The length of the forewings is 6.8 mm. The forewings are greyish brown, intermixed with greyish brown scales tipped with pale grey, pale grey scales and a few dark brown scales. The hindwings are pale grey.

The larvae feed on the fruit of Vepris nobilis.

Etymology
The species epithet, elgonae, refers to Mount Elgon, the only known collecting site for the species.

References

Endemic moths of Kenya
Moths described in 2010
Blastobasis
Moths of Africa